The Norseman is a 1978 American adventure film starring Lee Majors, directed, produced and written by Charles B. Pierce.

Plot
An 11th-century Viking prince sails to North America to find his father, who on a previous voyage had been captured by Native Americans.

Cast
Lee Majors - Thorvald
Cornel Wilde - Ragnar
Mel Ferrer - King Eurich
Jack Elam - Death Dreamer
Susie Coelho - Winetta
Christopher Connelly - Rolf
Jimmy Clem - Olif
Deacon Jones - Thrall
Denny Miller - Rauric
Kathleen Freeman - Old Indian Woman

Production
The film was a co production between Charles Pierce and Lee Majors with AIP doing the distribution. It was Pierce's first film with a major Hollywood studio.

Majors said it "took a lot of guts" to play a Viking but was persuaded by a fee of $500,000 and 10% of the profits. He later said "I had a little time off, and they said, “It shoots in Florida, on the coast there, out of Tampa,” and they had a bunch of Tampa Bay Buccaneers that were gonna play Vikings, so… I don’t know, I thought it’d be fun, so I did it."

The film was shot in Tampa, Florida. Post production was done at Pierce's $2 million facilitiy at Shreveport, Louisiana.

"There is no character to develop here and hardly any dialogue," said Majors, "this is a formula film."

Reception
The Los Angeles Times called it "tedious business".

References

External links
The Norseman review at The Guardian
The Norsemen at Letterbox DVD

1978 films
1970s adventure films
American adventure films
Films set in the Viking Age
Films set in pre-Columbian America
Films shot in Florida
Films directed by Charles B. Pierce
American International Pictures films
Films about Native Americans
1970s English-language films
1970s American films